The Great Enclosure (German - Das Große Gehege) or The Ostra Enclosure (Ostra-Gehege) is an 1831 oil on canvas painting by Caspar David Friedrich, now in the Galerie Neue Meister in Dresden, though it hangs in the Albertinum. It is known as the "crowning achievement of Friedrich's late work".

In 1832 the work was acquired by the Sächsischen Kunstverein. and was won in one of the Kunstverein's raffles in December 1832 by Gottlob Adolf Ernst von Nostitz und Jänkendorf. It was acquired by its present owner in 1909 from Ella von Nostitz und Jänckendorf.

See also
List of works by Caspar David Friedrich

References

External links

Paintings by Caspar David Friedrich
1831 paintings
Paintings in Dresden